Panajachel (Pana) is a town in the southwestern Guatemalan Highlands, less than  from Guatemala City, in the department of Sololá. It serves as the administrative centre for the surrounding municipality of the same name. Population was 11 thousand in the 2000 census, projected as 15,830 by June 30, 2020 and has approximately doubled each of the last few decades. The town of Panajachel is located on the Northeast shore of Lake Atitlán, and has become a centre for the tourist trade of the area as it provides a base for visitors crossing the lake to visit other towns and villages.

"Panajachel" derives from the Kaqchikel language and roughly translates to "place of the Matasanos," the white sapote fruit tree.

History

Spanish colony

In the 16th century, during the period of the Spanish conquest of Guatemala, the shore of the lake was the scene of a battle in which the Spanish and their Kaqchikel allies defeated the Tz'utujils. After the Spanish conquest of Guatemala, the Franciscans set up a church and monastery in Panajachel soon afterward, and used the town as a centre to convert the indigenous people of the region to the Roman Catholic faith. The original façade of the church still stands and is considered one of the gems of the colonial style in Guatemala.

Panajachel was part of the Tecpán Atitlán "corregimiento" (English: Province) and when it turned into a major municipality in 1730, Panajachel became part of it as well; regarding the Catholic faith, this was in charge of the  franciscans, who had convents and doctrines in the area covered by the modern departments of Sacatepéquez, Chimaltenango, Sololá, Quetzaltenango, Totonicapán, Suchitepéquez and Escuintla.  The "Provincia del Santísimo Nombre de Jesús" (English:"Province of the most Holy Name of Jesus"), as the Franciscan area was then called, reached up to 24 convents.  By 1700, Panajachel had a convent with three priests, in charge of ca. 1800 people, four doctrines and twelve cofradías.

Given that Panajachel had a convent, there was daily Mass attended by cofradías leaders and their wives, who kept lighted candles during most of the ceremony.  Also daily, there was religious teaching for 6-year-old girls and older starting at 2:00 pm and for boys of the same age starting at sunset;  the class lasted for 2 hours and consisted on memorizing the church teaching and prayers and to make some exercises with the catechism and it was run by a priest or by elder natives, called "fiscales".  Adults attended Mass every Sunday and holiday and after mass, there were religious teachings in their own language.

Lent was a time of the year when the friars prepared the natives thoroughly, using their own language to accomplish their goals; every Friday of Lent there was a procession following the Rosary steps all the way to the Calvary temple.

In 1754, as part of the borbon reforms, the Franciscans were forced to give their doctrines to the secular clergy; thus, when archbishop Pedro Cortés y Larraz visited Panajachel in 1770, he described it as the "San Francisco Panajachel parish".

Visit of archeologist Alfred P. Maudslay in 1892

In 1892, British archeologist Alfred Percival Maudslay and his wife, Anne Maudslay, visited Panajachel during their long journey throughout Guatemala; their impressions were reported in their book A glimpse at Guatemala, published in 1899.   They arrived to the town after spending a night in San Antonio Palopó and a short trip of 12 km; Anne Maudslay described Panajachel location as this: «a little town standing on a rich alluvial plain formed by a swift stream which issues from a narrow cleft in the hills, and has spread out the earth in the shape of an open fan until it forms a mile of frontage to the Lake Atitlan.»

By 1892, Panajachel people had already built numerous irrigation canals which had altered the normal stream bed to work on orchards, gardens and coffee plantations at the delta area.  Nevertheless, the channels were insufficient to protect the town infrastructure against flooding, which occurred once in a while; in fact, several years prior to the visit of the Maudslays, there had been a large flood that destroyed several houses and left the town isolated.  The town itself was not that interesting to the visitors, but their surroundings were marvelous: the volcanos, mountains and Lake Atitlan, whose green forests contrasted with the bare hills that surrounded Panajachel.  Life in town seemed monotonous to Anne Maudslay, especially that of women who seemed to have the same day every day, grinding corn to make tortillas and leaning over the stream shore to wash their family clothes.  Only those women that sold their produce in the central plaza market in the morning had a slightly different routine.

While in Panajachel, the visitors witnessed a religious ceremony by numerous pilgrims that were returning from visiting Esquipulas; pilgrims gathered in the central plaza that night around fires that they set for their food, and once they were done with their supper, they placed petates -native Guatemalan mats- on the floor in a line that crossed the plaza.  Each one of them grabbed a small wooden box where they produced a small Catholic saint sculpture, leaving that of the Esquipulas Black Christ, in the center. Once the preparations were ready, they began the ritual by cradling from one mat to the next, always on their knees and pressing their forehead against the floor in front of each saint; every man did this for several times and in the end, they all gathered around the Black Christ and sang a hymn for about thirty minutes; once done, gathered their belongings and went to sleep on the plaza floor. Anne Maudslay tells in her book that even though this seemed like a Catholic ritual, it was, in fact, a Mayan one; several priests that they found during their journey told them that they were not sure that the natives had really absorbed the Catholic faith that the conquistadors tried to instill in them for centuries.

20th century

The town attracted many Hippies in the 1960s, but the numbers of foreign visitors plummeted during the Guatemalan Civil War. After the war ended, tourists started coming back, and Panajachel's economy is once again primarily based on tourism.

21st century: Hurricane Stan

Panajachel was seriously affected by Hurricane Stan in October 2005 with a major mudslide destroying about 100 homes along the river.

Places of interest

Casa Cakchiquel built in 1948, was one of the first hotels on the lake and according to legend, Ernesto "Che" Guevara, Ingrid Bergman, and other intellectuals, artists, painters and writers enjoyed the house at its best. Today the house serves as the Cultural Center and is lovingly restored and one of two historic buildings "patrimonio culturales" (the central Church of Saint Francis of Assisi being the other) in Panajachel. 
Casa Cakchiquel features a Museum & Gallery space that is presenting Guatemala's first and unique historical photo museum with over 3000 photo images between 1860 - 1970 and Guatemala's most important photographers like Emilio and Roberto Eichenberger, Alberto G. Valdeavellano, Adolfo Biener, G. Hurter, Joaquín Muñoz, Lionel Stein, Pablo Sittler, el indio, Lito B. Zadik & Co. and others.

Casa Cakchiquel is the home of Radio 5, FM99.1 the local Radio Station in the Atitlan Basin. 

Panajachel is also home to one of the oldest art galleries in Central America, La Galeria directly down the street to Rancho Grande.

International organizations

Panajachel is home to many international non-profit organizations, such as Porch de Salomon, Mercado Global, Maya Traditions Foundation, Mayan Families, Thirteen Threads (Oxjalul B'atz'), Friendship Bridge, and Sharing the Dream.

Gallery

Climate

Panajachel has tropical climate (Köppen: Aw).

Geographic location

It is located at 6 km south of Sololá and 146 km west of Guatemala City.

See also
 
 
 Feast of Saint Francis
 La Aurora International Airport
 List of places in Guatemala

Notes and references

References

Bibliography

External links

 
 Galeria Panajachel

Municipalities of the Sololá Department